Rex Gene Foods was a United States supermarket chain of stores located in New Jersey from 1957 until the late 1990s. Rex Gene Foods competed directly with Foodtown, Pathmark and ShopRite in New Jersey until it went bankrupt toward the late 1990s.

Rex Gene Food was involved in controversy during its later years.

References

Defunct supermarkets of the United States